The Unit dummy force method provides a convenient means for computing displacements in structural systems. It is applicable for both linear and non-linear material behaviours as well as for systems subject to environmental effects, and hence more general than Castigliano's second theorem.

Discrete systems
Consider a discrete system such as trusses, beams or frames having members interconnected at the nodes. These member deformations give rise to the nodal displacements , which we want to determine.

We start by applying N virtual nodal forces , one for each wanted r, and find the virtual member forces  that are in equilibrium with :

In the case of a statically indeterminate system, matrix B is not unique because the set of  that satisfies nodal equilibrium is infinite. It can be computed as the inverse of the nodal equilibrium matrix of any primary system derived from the original system.

Imagine that internal and external virtual forces undergo, respectively, the real deformations and displacements; the virtual work done can be expressed as:

 External virtual work: 
 Internal virtual work: 

According to the virtual work principle, the two work expressions are equal:

Substitution of (1) gives

Since  contains arbitrary virtual forces, the above equation gives

It is remarkable that the computation in (2) does not involve any integration regardless of the complexity of the systems, and that the result is unique irrespective of the choice of primary system for B. It is thus far more convenient and general than the classical form of the dummy unit load method, which varies with the type of system as well as with the imposed external effects. On the other hand, it is important to note that Eq.(2) is for computing displacements or rotations of the nodes only. This is not a restriction because we can make any point into a node when desired.

Finally, the name unit load arises from the interpretation that the coefficients  in matrix B are the member forces in equilibrium with the unit nodal force , by virtue of Eq.(1).

General systems
For a general system, the unit dummy force method also comes directly from the virtual work principle. Fig.(a) shows a system with known actual deformations . These deformations, supposedly consistent, give rise to displacements throughout the system. For example, a point A has moved to A', and we want to compute the displacement r of A in the direction shown. For this particular purpose, we choose the virtual force system in Fig.(b) which shows:
 The unit force R* is at A and in the direction of r so that the external virtual work done by R* is, noting that the work done by the virtual reactions in (b) is zero because their displacements in (a) are zero:  is the desired displacement
 The internal virtual work done by the virtual stresses is where the virtual stresses  must satisfy equilibrium everywhere.

Equating the two work expressions gives the desired displacement:

Structural analysis